Days Creek Charter School is a public charter school in Days Creek, Oregon, United States.

Academics
In 2008, 71% of the school's seniors received their high school diploma. Of 21 students, 15 graduated, 3 dropped out, and 3 are still in high school.

References

High schools in Douglas County, Oregon
Public middle schools in Oregon
Charter schools in Oregon
Public high schools in Oregon